T-cell surface glycoprotein CD3 gamma chain is a protein that in humans is encoded by the CD3G gene.

T cell antigen receptor (TCR) is associated on the T cell surface with a complex of protein called CD3.  CD3G (gamma chain) is one of the four peptides (gamma, delta, epsilon and zeta) that form CD3.  Defects in CD3G are associated with T cell immunodeficiency.

See also
 CD3 (immunology)
 Cluster of differentiation

References

Further reading

External links
 
 

Clusters of differentiation